Harald Ernst  Braun  is a German historian of late medieval and early modern political culture emphasizing on the integration of political and intellectual history, theological-political discourse, Iberian empires and the Catholic world. He is a Reader in European History (1300-1700) at the University of Liverpool.One of his major contributions has focused on the political thought of Spanish historian Juan de Mariana.

Career
Braun got an MA in History, Politics, and German Language and Literature at Heidelberg University, German. He received his D.Phil. on Early Modern Catholic Political Thought at the University of Oxford. He was a temporary Lecture at King's College London (KCL) and the London School of Economics (LSE) until he joined the Department of History at Liverpool in 2004. In 2017, Braun was a Visiting Professor at École Normale Superieur de Lyon.

Braun is the founding editor of Routledge series of Early Modern Iberian History in Global Contexts: Connexions. He also is the founding editor of Renaissance and Early Modern Worlds of Knowledge, a book series of the Society for Renaissance Studies.

Works
Contexts of Conscience in Early Modern Europe (2004) with Edward Vallance
Juan de Mariana and Early Modern Spanish Political Thought (2007)
The Renaissance Conscience (2011) with Edward Vallance
Theorising the Ibero-American Atlantic (2013) with Lisa Vollendorf
The Transatlantic Hispanic Baroque: Complex identities in the Atlantic World (2016) with Jesús Pérez-Magallón
A Companion to the Spanish Scholastics (2021) with Erik De Bom and Paolo Astorri

References 

Fellows of the Royal Historical Society
Year of birth missing (living people)
Living people
German historians